Roger Vachon (born 29 August 1957) is a French judoka. He competed at the 1984 Summer Olympics and the 1988 Summer Olympics.

References

External links
 

1957 births
Living people
French male judoka
Olympic judoka of France
Judoka at the 1984 Summer Olympics
Judoka at the 1988 Summer Olympics
Sportspeople from Paris
21st-century French people
20th-century French people